The 2017 National Lacrosse League season, the 31st in the history of the NLL began on December 29, 2016, and ended with the Champion's Cup Finals series on June 10, 2017, as the Georgia Swarm defeated the Saskatchewan Rush to win their franchise's first Champions Cup.

Regular Season Standings

Playoffs

*Overtime

Awards

Annual awards

All-pro teams
Reference

First Team
 Lyle Thompson, Georgia Swarm
 Mark Matthews, Saskatchewan Rush
 Corey Small, Vancouver Stealth
 Jason Noble, Georgia Swarm
 Brodie Merrill, Toronto Rock
 Dillon Ward, Colorado Mammoth

Second Team 
 Curtis Dickson, Calgary Roughnecks
 Kevin Crowley, New England Black Wolves
 Shayne Jackson, Georgia Swarm
 Graeme Hossack, Rochester Knighthawks
 Jay Thorimbert, New England Black Wolves
 Mike Poulin, Georgia Swarm

All-Rookie Team 
 Tom Schreiber, Toronto Rock
 Kyle Jackson, Rochester Knighthawks
 Josh Currier, Rochester Knighthawks
 Latrell Harris, Toronto Rock
 Mike Messenger, Saskatchewan Rush
 Joel Coyle, New England Black Wolves

Stadiums and locations

Attendances

See also
 2017 in sports

References

National Lacrosse League
National Lacrosse League seasons